Antonino Tringali Casanuova (11 April 1888 – 30 October 1943) was an Italian politician who served under Benito Mussolini in the Italian Social Republic.

Tringali-Casanova was born in Cecina, Province of Livorno, Tuscany.

His first government assignment was vice-president for Special Tribunal for the State Defence from September 1928 until November 1932. He then served as president from November 1932 until July 1943. He was a fascist hardliner, and on 24 July 1943, as member of the Gran Consiglio del Fascismo, he voted against the Ordine del Giorno Grandi, joining Mussolini's side.

In September 1943 he was appointed Italian Social Republic's first Minister of Justice. On 30 October 1943 he died as a result of angina pectoris and was replaced as Minister of Justice by Piero Pisenti.

External links
 Italian Government(  2009-10-25) at www.geocities.com
 Cipriani at www.fondazionecipriani.it

1888 births
1943 deaths
People from Cecina, Tuscany
Italian nobility
Italian Ministers of Justice
Members of the Grand Council of Fascism
Deputies of Legislature XXIX of the Kingdom of Italy
Members of the Chamber of Fasces and Corporations
People of the Italian Social Republic
Politicians of Tuscany
Italian military personnel of World War I
Deaths from angina pectoris